Longwitton station was a weather board and corrugated iron built railway station in Northumberland on the Rothbury Branch. Originally known as Rothley and built as a private halt for the Trevelyan Estate, the name was changed in 1875 to Longwitton when it became a public station.

History

They also were permitted to build a short branch line to Cornhill. The North British Railway and the branch line became part of the London and North Eastern Railway in 1923. In September 1952 passenger services were withdrawn and the line closed in November 1963.

The station was opened as Rothley a private station serving the local Trevelyan Estate but became public when the line was absorbed into the North British Railway. Renamed Longwitton in April 1875 the station served a limestone quarry and colliery until the 1920s. On 3 July 1875 a major accident occurred on the line just south of  leading to the deaths of three people.

References

External links
Longwitton station on Disused Stations
Longwitton on a navigable 1956 O. S. map
The line on RailScot

Disused railway stations in Northumberland
Former North British Railway stations
Railway stations in Great Britain opened in 1870
Railway stations in Great Britain closed in 1952
1870 establishments in England